Issou is a commune in the Yvelines department, administrative region of Île-de-France, France.

See also
Communes of the Yvelines department

References

Communes of Yvelines